Martin Allen Harrison (born September 20, 1967) is a former American football defensive end who played ten seasons in the National Football League for the San Francisco 49ers, the Minnesota Vikings, and the Seattle Seahawks. He played college football for the University of Washington. Harrison attended Newport High School in Bellevue, Washington and was a multiple letter winner in both football and track and field. In 1983, when he was 15 years old, he placed sixth in the national AAU Junior Olympics in the decathlon.

He received a Bachelor of Arts degree from the University of Washington.

College

University of Washington (1985–1990)

Honors, awards, and highlights
 Sophomore, Honorable Mention All-American Team – The Sporting News.
 Three-year starter.
 Co-captain in 1989. Defensive Lineman Of The Year in 1989.
 Senior year- received league honors "Honorable Mention" as outside linebacker behind Junior Seau and Carnell Lake, both first round NFL Draft picks.
 4 quarterback sacks vs Oregon, 5 tackles for loss vs. Washington State University, 21 tackles for loss during the 1989 season.
 38 career tackles for loss, 275 career tackles, and 34 career starts.

NFL career

San Francisco 49ers (1990–1993)
In 1990, Harrison made the 49ers as a tenth round draft pick. That year the team finished the season with a 14–2 regular season record. Because of injury, he saw limited action. In 1991 Harrison was released on the final cut then re-signed the next day to the practice squad, where he spent the entire season. However, in the next two years, he played in 27 games, starting two of them.

While with the 49ers Harrison made it to the National Football Conference championship game three times, in 1990, 1992 and 1993.  However, the team lost each year, once to the New York Giants (1990) and twice to the Dallas Cowboys (1992 and 1993).

He finished his tenure with the 49ers with a total of 9.5 sacks, 2 forced fumbles, and 39 tackles.

Minnesota Vikings (1994–1996)

1994–1995
At age 27, Harrison switched teams in hopes of getting more playing time. In his first season with the Vikings he played in 13 games, mostly on special teams. Harrison had more playing time and made a bigger impact the next season, getting to the quarterback 4.5 times, making 10 tackles and getting his only career interception, which he returned for ten yards.

1996
Harrison was named the starter at right defensive end in 1996. He managed his best season statistically, racking up 7 sacks and 21 tackles while starting in only 8 games.

Seattle Seahawks (1997)

Minnesota Vikings (1999)
Harrison spent his last year in the NFL with the Minnesota Vikings in 1999. Due to a knee injury, he did not see much action that year, playing in only four games.

Career highlights
He completed his career with a total of 21 sacks, 1 interception, 3 forced fumbles, 1 fumble recovered and 90 tackles – 77 unassisted and 13 assisted.

NFL Statistics

Key:(GP) games played - (GS) games started - (FF) forced fumbles - (TK) tackles - (INT) interceptions

1991 SFO practice squad

See also
 Washington Huskies football statistical leaders

References

1967 births
Living people
American football defensive ends
American football linebackers
Washington Huskies football players
San Francisco 49ers players
Minnesota Vikings players
Seattle Seahawks players
Sportspeople from Bellevue, Washington
People from Livermore, California
Players of American football from California
Sportspeople from Alameda County, California